Coin collectors have various options for storing their coin collections.  The various options depend on a few different requirements such as; protection from oxidation and other chemical damage, protection from mechanical damage, ease of viewing and organization, and protection from loss or theft.

For these requirements, a few more common options include; plastic flips, cardboard flips, coin folders (press-in type), coin tubes, coin albums, and for higher value individual coins, coin slabs. The collection can then be placed in specialty designed coin storage boxes.  Common storage boxes are available for 2x2 coin flips and various brands of coin slabs.

To prevent theft coin collectors use safes and bank safety deposit boxes.  Each type of storage solves some of the challenges of safely storing a coin collection, but few completely solve all of them alone and thus, many collectors use multiple layers of protection to improve the safety of their coins.  The more valuable the coin the more elaborate the storage solutions  and sizable the collection.

While it may seem counter-intuitive, some storage methods can actually damage coins.  Soft PVC and cardboard contain sulfur and other acidic or oxidizing materials.  For expensive coins that can be tarnished, collectors should avoid using cardboard folders, paper or plastic bags, certain plastic tubes, and any other storage container that is not chemically inert.

References 

Coin collecting
Collecting
Storage systems